Königsstuhl (17 May 1976 – 1995) was a German thoroughbred racehorse and sire. In 1979 he won the German Triple Crown and is the first horse that won all the races necessary for this crown. Since 1979 no other horse has won the crown. In addition to racing success, he was named German horse of 1979 and was German champion sire in 1988 and 1994.

Background
Königsstuhl was a black/darkbay thoroughbred. The stallion was born at the stud Zoppenbroich in West Germany. He was a son of Dschingis Khan (1961–1986) (Tamerlane -Donna Diana) and his dam was Königskrönung (1958–† ) (Tiepoletto-Krönung).

His dam Königskrönung was a great distance horse during her racing career, but also a big horse. Her first foals were much too big for a racing career. Kurt Bresges, the stud manager and owner of stud Zoippenbroich, made some stud experiments before he took a small stallion for his big mare.

On 17 May 1976 a black/darkbay colt was born. Königsstuhl was not a beauty in his young years. He had problems with his legs and had also a big head. The farrier gave him position help for hoof correction. In October 1977, Bresges died. His wife had to take over the stud management. She gave all yearlings and also Königsstuhl to horse trainer Sven von Mitzlaff. Bresges sold most of the yearlings, but Mitzlaff advised her to keep Königsstuhl. So the horse remained in possession. In August 1995 he died of colic.

Racing career
His racing career was from 1978 to 1981. Königsstuhl started 20 times and won eleven races. He raced in Germany and Italy.

In June 1978 Königsstuhl started his racing career. He ran in a German trail run (Versuchsrennen der Hengste, Köln) about 1.000 m and came in second after My Rocket (Rocket – Macoletta). Next he won his maiden race: Limbo-Rennen Gelsenkirchen – 1200 m.

In spring 1979 he qualified for the German Derby (Ger-Gr. I 2400m) and won the German 2000-Guineas (Ger-Gr. 2). In the summer of 1979 he won the German Derby (Ger-Gr. 1 2400m). After this he won some important races and in autumn 1979 he won the German St. Leger (Ger-Gr. II 2800m) to complete the German Triple Crown.

On 25 October 1980, Königsstuhl was sent to Italy to contest the Group One Gran Premio del Jockey Club over 2400 metres. Ridden by Peter Alafi, he started as a 6/5 favourite and won by five lengths from Solero.

Racing results
1978
1st Limbo-Rennen 1000m
2nd Versuchsrennen der Hengste 1200m

1979
1st Preis der Frankfurter Messe 1600m, Blitz Tip Pokal (Frühjahrs Dreijährigen Preis) G3 2000m, Henkel-Rennen (German 2000 Guineas) G2 1600m, Deutsches Derby G1 2400m, Aral-Pokal G1 2400m. Deutsches St. Leger G2 2800m,
2nd Frühlingsrennen 1650m, Union Rennen G2 2200m, Großer Preis von Baden G1 2400m

1980
1st Großer Preis der Stadt Gelsenkirchen G3 2400m,
2nd Großer Preis von Düsseldorf G2 2200m

1981
1st Großer Preis von Düsseldorf G2 2200m, Hansa Preis G2 2200m, Gran Premio del Jockey Club Italiano G1 2400m,
2nd Gerling Preis G2 2400m, Großer Preis von Berlin G1 2400m

Awards
Königsstuhl was the German Horse of the Year in 1979. Champion sire in 1988 and 1994.

Stud record
Königsstuhl was one of the Germany's most successful sires. He was named as Champion sire in 1988 and in 1994.

One of his notable offspring is Monsun, a leading racehorse and sire. Another son, Lavirco, was the 1996 Deutsches Derby winner.

Pedigree

References

1976 racehorse births
1995 racehorse deaths
German Thoroughbred Horse of the Year
Racehorses bred in Germany
Racehorses trained in Germany
Thoroughbred family 5-h
Triple Crown of Thoroughbred Racing winners